Link Sar is a mountain located in the Masherbrum range of the Karakoram between the head of the Charakusa Glacier and the Kaberi Glacier. The peak lies on a horseshoe which links K6 and K7 around the head of the Charakusa Glacier.

Climbing history
Isolated, steep and protected by significant snow and ice, Link Sar remained one of the world's highest unclimbed peaks until 2019.

Attempts were made by Japanese teams in the mid-1970s. After this time few permits to access the mountain from the east were available due to the proximity to the contested border between Pakistan and India. Steve Swenson was granted a permit with others in 2001 and they made some limited progress from this side of the mountain. Attempts to obtain permits over the next decade for a return were denied.

Jon Griffith made attempts on the western side of the mountain from 2011 with different climbing partners, scaling the Northwest Face in 2015 with Andy Houseman to reach the subsidiary peak of Link Sar West (6,938m). Illness and a narrowing window in the weather led to a decision not to press on the further 1 km to the main summit.

Swenson was eventually able to return to the eastern side in 2017 with Graham Zimmerman and Chris Wright. In atrocious weather they only reached a height of 5,900m on the Southwest Face but the experience enabled them to identify a possible safe route to the summit.

On 6 August 2019 the summit was reached by Steve Swenson, Mark Richey, Graham Zimmerman and Chris Wright via the mountain's Southeast Face.

References

Seven-thousanders of the Karakoram
Mountains of Gilgit-Baltistan